Thomas Torrie (13 April 1857 – 18 June 1913) was a Scotland international rugby union player.

Rugby Union career

Amateur career

He played for Edinburgh Academicals.

Provincial career

He played for East of Scotland District in February 1876.

Torrie was selected for Edinburgh District. He played in the Inter-City match of December 1876 against Glasgow District; and for Edinburgh District against East of Scotland District in January 1877.

International career

He was capped once for Scotland, against England in 1877.

Business career

After rugby union, Torrie became a tea-planter in Assam, Ceylon. He was named as a tea-planter in John M. Crabbie's will, in the Morning Post of 4 March 1898.

Family

Torrie was born to parents Thomas Jameson Torrie, the advocate, geologist and botanist, and Catherine Paton Jameson. He had 3 siblings Janet, Robert and Lawrence. He married Jane Crabbie, daughter of John M. Crabbie of Duncow, the wine merchant and distiller. By 1901 he was staying in London, but moved to Vancouver in Canada in 1907. His sister Janet married Dr. Claud Muirhead; their only child died in infancy; and Janet Torrie died in 1874 and Claud Muirhead died in 1910. This meant a competing claim for their estate between the surviving Torrie brothers - Lawrence had died in 1909 - and the Muirhead family. The judge Lord Skerrington ruled in favour of the Muirhead family. Thomas Torrie died in St. Andrews in 1913, leaving an estate of £16,747 and 17 shillings and 7 pence.

References

1857 births
1913 deaths
Scotland international rugby union players
Edinburgh District (rugby union) players
East of Scotland District players
Edinburgh Academicals rugby union players
Rugby union players from Edinburgh
Scottish rugby union players
Rugby union forwards